Kustovoy Island is an island in the Ob River in Pervomaysky District of Novosibirsk, Russia. It lies opposite the mouth of the Inya River.

Buildings and structures
In the northern part of the island there is a boat station, which consists of seven buildings.

The Bugrinsky Bridge passes over the island.

References

Islands of Novosibirsk
Ob River